Deinococcus murrayi is a bacterium. It is extremely gamma radiation-resistant. Its type strain is ALT-1b (= DSM 11303).

References

Further reading

External links

LPSN
Type strain of Deinococcus murrayi at BacDive -  the Bacterial Diversity Metadatabase

Deinococcales
Polyextremophiles
Radiodurants
Bacteria described in 1997